N.N. Club or N.N. Kilburn—N.N. standing for "No Names" —was an amateur English football club based in the Kilburn district of London.  The poor state of the club's original ground led to them being nicknamed the Mudlarks.

The club's first recorded matches were victories over Barnes F. C. in January and April 1863. It was one of the eleven founding sides of the Football Association on 26 October 1863, and was represented by club captain Arthur Pember,
who was elected as the FA's first president. 

Although the N.N.s enjoyed goodwill as an FA founder, and in 1866 was one of the mere three clubs that played exclusively Association laws, the club was never considered one of the elite clubs, and, after Arthur Pember's emigration in 1868, interest in the club dwindled.  In the 1869-70 season, the club often had to play without new captain Tebbutt and by the time of the club's final reported match - a defeat by Upton Park FC on 5 February 1870 - only seven members turned up to play.   

The club sent a representative to the annual meeting of the Football Association that month, and two players in the first representative match between England and Scotland on 3 March 1870 are listed as N.N. players, but subsequent published lists of fixtures fail to show any activity from the club and there are no further results for the club available. The club is absent from lists of Football Association members from 1871 onwards.

The Brondesbury club, founded in 1871, was considered a resurrection of N.N. and occasionally listed as Brondesbury N.N.

Colours

The club's colours were blue jerseys, with N.N. embroidered on the chest in red letters.

See also

N.N. Club players

References

Defunct football clubs in England
Defunct football clubs in London
Sport in the London Borough of Camden
Sport in the London Borough of Brent
1863 establishments in England
Association football clubs established in 1863
Association football clubs disestablished in 1870